LaMia Flight 2933 was a charter flight of an Avro RJ85, operated by LaMia, that on 28 November 2016 crashed near Medellín, Colombia, killing 71 of the 77 people on board. The aircraft was transporting the Brazilian Chapecoense football squad and their entourage from Santa Cruz de la Sierra, Bolivia, to Medellín, where the team was scheduled to play at the 2016 Copa Sudamericana Finals. One of the four crew members, three of the players, and two other passengers survived with injuries.

The official report from Colombia's civil aviation agency, Aerocivil, found the causes of the crash to be fuel exhaustion due to an inappropriate flight plan by the airline, and pilot error regarding poor decision making as the situation worsened, including a failure to declare an emergency after fuel levels became critically low, thus failing to inform air traffic control at Medellin that a priority landing was required.

Background

Aircraft and operator 

The aircraft was an Avro RJ85, registration CP-2933, serial number E.2348, which first flew on 26 March 1999. After service with other airlines and a period in storage between 2010 and 2013, it was acquired by LaMia, a Venezuelan-owned airline operating out of Bolivia.

Crew 
The captain was 36-year-old Miguel Quiroga, who had been a former Bolivian Air Force (FAB) pilot and had previously flown for EcoJet, which also operated the Avro RJ85. He joined LaMia in 2013 and at the time of the accident he was one of the airline's co-owners as well as a flight instructor. Quiroga had logged a total of 6,692 flight hours, including 3,417 hours on the Avro RJ85.

The first officer was 47-year-old Fernando Goytia, who had also been a former FAB pilot. He received his type rating on the Avro RJ85 five months before the accident and had had 6,923 flight hours, with 1,474 of them on the Avro RJ85.

Another pilot was 29-year-old Sisy Arias, who was undergoing training and was an observer in the cockpit. She had been interviewed by TV before the flight.

Flight and crash 

The aircraft was carrying 73 passengers and four crew members on a flight from Viru Viru International Airport, in the Bolivian city of Santa Cruz de la Sierra, to José María Córdova International Airport, serving Medellín in Colombia, and located in nearby Rionegro. Among the passengers were 22 players of the Brazilian Associação Chapecoense de Futebol club, 23 staff, 21 journalists, and two guests. The team was travelling to play their away leg of the Final for the 2016 Copa Sudamericana in Medellín against Atlético Nacional.

Background and transit to Bolivia
Chapecoense's initial request to charter LaMia for the whole journey from São Paulo to Medellín was refused by the National Civil Aviation Agency of Brazil because the limited scope of freedom of the air agreements between the two countries, under International Civil Aviation Organization rules, would have required the use of a Brazilian or Colombian airline for such a service. The club opted to retain LaMia and arranged a flight with Boliviana de Aviación  from São Paulo to Santa Cruz de la Sierra, Bolivia, where it was to board the LaMia flight. LaMia had previously transported other teams for international competitions, including Chapecoense and the Argentina national team, which had flown on the same aircraft two weeks before. The flight from São Paulo landed at Santa Cruz at 16:50 local time.

Flight from Santa Cruz

The  RJ85 operating LaMia flight 2933 departed Santa Cruz at 18:18 local time. A Chapecoense team member's request to have a video game retrieved from his luggage in the aircraft's cargo delayed departure. The original flight plan included an intermediate refueling stop at the Cobija–Captain Aníbal Arab Airport, near Bolivia's border with Brazil; however, the flight's late departure meant the aircraft would not arrive at Cobija prior to the airport's closing time. An officer of Bolivia's Airports and Air Navigation Services Administration (AASANA – ) at Santa Cruz de la Sierra reportedly rejected the crew's flight plan for a direct flight to Medellín several times despite pressure to approve it, because of the aircraft's range being almost the same as the flight distance. The flight plan was approved by another AASANA officer.

The flight crew anticipated a fuel consumption of 8,858 kg for their planned route of 1,611 nmi (including 200 kg for taxiing). After refueling at Santa Cruz, CP2933 had 9,073 kg on board. ICAO regulations would have required them to carry a total fuel load of 12,052 kg, to allow for holding, diversion, and other contingencies. The RJ85's fuel tanks have a capacity of 9,362 kg. Around 21:16, about 180 nmi from their destination, the aircraft displayed a low-fuel warning. At this point, they were 77 nmi from Bogotá, but the crew took no steps to divert there, nor to inform ATC of the situation. The RJ85 continued on course and began its descent towards Medellín at 21:30.

Another aircraft had diverted to Medellín from its planned route (from Bogotá to San Andres) because of a suspected fuel leak. Medellín air traffic controllers gave that aircraft priority to land and at 21:43 the LaMia RJ85's crew was instructed to enter a racetrack-shaped holding pattern at the Rionegro VHF omnidirectional range (VOR) radio navigation beacon and wait with three other aircraft for its turn to land. While waiting for the other aircraft to land, during the last 15 minutes of its flight, the RJ85 completed two laps of the holding pattern.

At 21:49, the crew requested priority for landing because of unspecified "problems with fuel", and were told to expect an approach clearance in "approximately seven minutes". Minutes later, at 21:52, they declared a fuel emergency and requested immediate descent clearance and "vectors" for approach. At 21:53, with the aircraft nearing the end of its second lap of the holding pattern, engines 3 and 4 (the two engines on the right wing) flamed out due to fuel exhaustion; engines 1 and 2 flamed out two minutes later, at which point the flight data recorder (FDR) stopped operating. Shortly before 22:00 the pilot reported an electrical failure and fuel exhaustion while flying in Colombian airspace between the municipalities of La Ceja and La Unión. Air traffic control radar stopped detecting the aircraft at 21:55 local time as it descended among the mountains south of the airport.

Rescue 

It was not until 02:00 on 29 November that the first survivor arrived at a hospital: Alan Ruschel, one of the Chapecoense team members. Six people were found alive in the wreckage. The last survivor to be found was footballer Neto who was discovered at 05:40. Chapecoense backup goalkeeper Jakson Follmann underwent a potentially life-saving leg amputation. 71 of the 77 occupants died as a result of the crash. The number of dead was initially thought to be 75, but it was later revealed that four people had not boarded the aircraft. Colombian Air Force personnel extracted the bodies of 71 victims from the wreckage and took them to an air force base. They were then taken to the Instituto de Medicina Legal in Medellín for identification.

Investigation

Colombian crash investigation

The Air Accident Investigation Group (GRIAA – ) investigation group of Colombia's Special Administrative Unit of Civil Aeronautics (UAEAC or Aerocivil – ) began investigating the accident and requested assistance from BAE Systems (the successor company to British Aerospace, the aircraft’s manufacturer) and the British Air Accidents Investigation Branch (AAIB) as the investigative body of the state of the manufacturer. A team of three AAIB accident investigators was deployed. They were joined by investigators from Bolivia's national aviation authority, the General Directorate of Civil Aviation (DGAC – ). In all, twenty-three specialists were deployed on the investigation; in addition to ten Colombian investigators and those from Bolivia and the United Kingdom, Brazil and the United States contributed personnel to the investigation. On the afternoon of 29 November the UAEAC reported that both flight recorders – the flight data recorder (FDR) and cockpit voice recorder (CVR) – had been recovered undamaged.

Evidence very quickly emerged to suggest that the aircraft had run out of fuel: the flight attendant who survived the accident reported that the captain's final words were "there is no fuel", and transmissions to that effect from the pilots to ATC were overheard by crews of other aircraft, and recorded in the control tower. Shortly after the crash, the person leading the investigation stated that there was "no evidence of fuel in the aircraft" and the aircraft did not catch fire when it crashed. Analysis of the FDR showed all four engines flamed out a few minutes before the crash.
 
The investigation found that LaMia had consistently operated its fleet without the legally required endurance fuel load, and had simply been lucky to avoid any of the delays that the mandated fuel load were meant to allow for. An investigative report by Spanish-language American media company Univision, using data from the Flightradar24 website, claimed that the airline had broken the fuel and loading regulations of the International Civil Aviation Organization on 8 of its 23 previous flights since 22 August. This included two direct flights from Medellín to Santa Cruz: one on 29 October transporting Atlético Nacional to the away leg of their Copa Sudamericana semifinal, and a flight without passengers on 4 November. The report claimed the eight flights would have used at least some of the aircraft's mandatory fuel reserves (a variable fuel quantity to allow for an additional 45 minutes of flying time), concluding the company was accustomed to operating flights at the limit of the RJ85's endurance.

Findings in the final report
On 27 April 2018, the investigators, led by Aerocivil, released the final investigative report for the crash of Flight 2933, listing the following causal factors:

The airline inappropriately planned the flight without considering the necessary amount of fuel that would be needed to fly to an alternate airport, fuel reserves, contingencies, or the required minimum fuel to land;
The four engines shut down in sequence as a result of fuel exhaustion;
Poor decision making by LaMia employees "as a result of processes that failed to ensure operational security";
Poor decision making by the flight crew, who continued the flight on extremely limited fuel despite being aware of the low fuel levels aboard the aircraft and who did not take corrective actions to land the aircraft and refuel.

Additional contributing factors cited by the investigators were:

Deploying the landing gear early; 
"Latent deficiencies" in the planning and execution of non-regular flights related to the insufficient supply of fuel;
Specific deficiencies in the planning of the flight by LaMia;
"Lack of supervision and operational control" by LaMia, which did not supervise the planning of the flight or its execution, nor did it provide advice to the flight crew;
Failure to request priority or declare an emergency by the flight crew, particularly when fuel exhaustion became imminent; these actions would have allowed air traffic services to provide the necessary attention;
Failure by the airline to follow the fuel management rules that the Bolivian DGAC had approved in certifying the company;
Delays in CP-2933's approach to the runway resulting from its late declaration of priority and of fuel emergency, added to dense traffic in the Ríonegro VOR area.

Other findings
The CVR had recorded the pilots discussing their fuel state and possible fuel stops en route, but they were so accustomed to operating with minimal fuel that they decided against a fuel stop when ATC happened to assign them an adjustment in their route which saved a few minutes of flight time. Aviation analyst John Nance and GRIAA investigators Julian Echeverri and Miguel Camacho would later suggest that the most probable explanation is that the flight's captain, who was also a part owner of LaMia, pulled the circuit breaker on the CVR to prevent a record of the subsequent discussions, knowing that the flight did not have the appropriate fuel load.

The flight plan, which was filed with AASANA, included a cruising altitude of FL300 (approximately ). The flight plan was sent for review to Colombian and Brazilian authorities as well, in accordance with regional regulations.

Bolivian criminal investigation
A week after the crash, Bolivian police detained the general director of LaMia on various charges, including involuntary manslaughter. His son, who worked for the DGAC, was detained for allegedly using his influence to have the aircraft given an operational clearance. A prosecutor involved with the case told reporters that "the prosecution has collected statements and evidence showing the participation of the accused in the crimes of misusing influence, conduct incompatible with public office and a breach of duties."

An arrest warrant was issued for the employee of AASANA in Santa Cruz who had refused to approve Flight 2933's flight plan - it was later approved by another official. She fled the country seeking political asylum in Brazil, claiming that after the crash she had been pressured by her superiors to alter a report she had made before the aircraft took off and that she feared that Bolivia would not give her a fair trial. A warrant was also issued for the arrest of another of LaMia's co-owners, but he still had not been located four weeks after the crash.

Reactions

Governmental 

Bolivia's General Directorate of Civil Aviation (DGAC – ) suspended LaMia's air operator's certificate, and impounded its remaining two RJ85s. The Bolivian government suspended the director of the DGAC and the chief executive of AASANA as well as the director of the DGAC’s National Aeronautics Registry—the son of one of LaMia's owners. Bolivia's Defense Minister expressed concern over the possibility of aviation sanctions and downgrades by foreign national aviation authorities, for which consequences may include banning Bolivian carriers from foreign airspace.

Brazilian President Michel Temer declared three days of national mourning and requested that personnel from Brazil's embassy to Colombia in Bogotá be moved to Medellín to better assist the survivors and the families of the victims.

Sports 

Many South American football teams paid tribute to Chapecoense by changing their playing kits to include Chapecoense's badge or wearing Chapecoense's playing kit or green colours. Matches all over the world also began with a minute of silence.

CONMEBOL
Atlético Nacional, Chapecoense's opponents-to-be in the final, asked CONMEBOL to honor Chapecoense by awarding them the Copa Sudamericana title, stating that "for our part, and forever, Chapecoense are champions of the 2016 Copa Sudamericana". CONMEBOL officially named Chapecoense the 2016 Copa Sudamericana champions on 5 December. The Brazilian team received the winner's prize money (US $2 million) and was awarded qualification to the 2017 Copa Libertadores, 2017 Recopa Sudamericana against Atlético Nacional and the 2017 Suruga Bank Championship against J1 League champions Urawa Red Diamonds. Atlético Nacional also received the CONMEBOL Centennial Fair Play Award in recognition of its sportsmanship in suggesting that Chapecoense be awarded the title.

FIFA
FIFA president Gianni Infantino gave a speech at Arena Condá, Chapecoense's stadium, at a public memorial. A committee representing FIFA at the service was composed of former football legends Clarence Seedorf and Carles Puyol; and Real Madrid player Lucas Silva. Infantino gave his speech at the end of the service by saying: "Today we are all Brazilians, we are all Chapecoenses". Nacional were awarded the FIFA Fair Play Award for requesting the Copa Sudamerica title to be awarded to Chapecoense.

UEFA
UEFA officially asked for a minute's silence at all upcoming Champions League and Europa League matches as a mark of respect.
President Aleksander Ceferin said in a statement: "European football is united in expressing its deepest sympathy to Chapecoense, the Brazilian football confederation, CONMEBOL and the families of all the victims following this week's air disaster".

National football associations
The Argentine Football Association sent a support letter to Chapecoense offering free loans of players from Argentine clubs.

The Brazilian Football Confederation (CBF) encouraged Chapecoense to play its next scheduled Campeonato Brasileiro Série A game against Clube Atlético Mineiro, part of the final round of the tournament, as a tribute to the players. Both Chapecoense and Atlético Mineiro refused to play the match, but they were not fined by the Superior Court of Sports Justice.

Besides changing their profile pictures on social media to a black version of Chapecoense's badge and issuing messages of solidarity, other Brazilian teams offered to loan the club players for the next year and asked the CBF to exempt Chapecoense from relegation for the next three years.

In Colombia, a four-hour tribute took place at Atlético Nacional's stadium at the time the match Chapecoense had been scheduled to play would have kicked off. This was attended by 40,000 spectators with live coverage on Fox Sports and a live stream on YouTube.

The Uruguayan Football Association declared two days of mourning. The association's referees wore a Chapecoense badge on their shirts for the 14th matchday of the Uruguayan Primera División.

Other 
Avianca, Colombia's flag carrier and largest airline, provided 44 psychologists to help in the counseling of the families of the victims. The airline, by request of the Colombian and Brazilian governments, also provided logistical support and transportation to Brazilian medical personnel who were involved in the identification of the deceased. On Twitter, Avianca expressed its regrets over the incident and stated that "our prayers are with the families of the victims".

LaMia's insurance policy with Bolivian insurer Bisa had lapsed beginning in October 2016 for nonpayment; while said policy did not cover flights to Colombia, which the insurer included as part of a geographical exclusion clause along with several African countries, as well as Peru, Afghanistan, Syria and Iraq. Nonetheless, the insurers agreed to fund a compensation scheme that would pay US$225,000 to each deceased passenger's family.

During an interview, Roberto Canessa, a member of a Uruguayan rugby team that was travelling to a match in 1972 when their aircraft crashed in what became known as the Andes flight disaster, said that he wanted to help the crash survivors.

Spanish club FC Barcelona hosted Chapecoense for a friendly fundraiser on 7 August 2017, in order to help rebuild Chapecoense's team. Barcelona won 5–0. Alan Ruschel, one of the three surviving players, played his first game since the tragedy. He started the game as the captain and he played until the 35th minute, when he was substituted.

In all copies of FIFA 17, players were given the Chapecoense emblem for free to wear for their FIFA Ultimate Team Club.

Survivors 
The surviving players were Alan Ruschel, Jakson Follmann and Neto. The other survivors were a flight attendant and two passengers. One of the surviving passengers, an employee of a Bolivian company contracted by LaMia to provide maintenance technicians to accompany the aircraft, said that there was no announcement by the pilots that there was an emergency and he thought the aircraft was simply descending prior to the crash. Chapecoense  goalkeeper Danilo was initially reported to have survived the crash and to have been taken to a hospital, where he later succumbed to his injuries. However, the San Vicente Fundación hospital from Medellín clarified a few days later that he died in the crash.
	
Brazilian radio personality Rafael Henzel, who was a passenger on the flight and the only journalist to survive, later died on 26 March 2019 from a heart attack.

Notable fatalities

Chapecoense players 

 Ailton Cesar Junior Alves da Silva (Canela), 22
 Dener Assunção Braz (Dener), 25
 Marcelo Augusto Mathias da Silva (Marcelo), 25
 Matheus Bitencourt da Silva (Matheus Biteco), 21
 Mateus Lucena dos Santos (Caramelo), 22
 Guilherme Gimenez de Souza (Gimenez), 21
 Lucas Gomes da Silva (Lucas Gomes), 26
 Everton Kempes dos Santos Gonçalves (Kempes), 34
 Arthur Brasiliano Maia (Arthur Maia), 24
 Ananias Eloi Castro Monteiro (Ananias), 27
 Marcos Danilo Padilha (Danilo), 31
 Filipe José Machado (Filipe Machado), 32
 Sérgio Manoel Barbosa Santos (Sérgio Manuel), 27
 José Gildeixon Clemente de Paiva (Gil), 29
 Bruno Rangel Domingues (Bruno Rangel), 34
 Cléber Santana Loureiro (Cléber Santana), 35
 Josimar Rosado da Silva Tavares (Josimar), 30
 William Thiego de Jesus (Thiego), 30
 Tiago da Rocha Vieira Alves (Tiaguinho), 22

Chapecoense staff 
 Luiz Carlos Saroli (Caio Júnior), coach, 51

Media 
 Mário Sérgio Pontes de Paiva, Fox Sports commentator, former national team player and manager, 66
 Paulo Julio Clement, Fox Sports, 51
 Victorino Chermont, Fox Sports, 43

Guests 
 Delfim de Pádua Peixoto Filho (Delfim Peixoto), Brazilian Football Confederation former vice-president, 75

In popular culture 
The United States cable TV network ESPN produced an hour long story about the crash for its E:60 news magazine TV show.  It focused on how one of the pilots was also a co-owner of the airline company and the effects on the survivors and on family members of the people killed in the accident.

The crash of LaMia Flight 2933 was covered in "Football Tragedy", a Season 19 (2019) episode of the internationally syndicated Canadian TV documentary series Mayday.  The show premiered in the United States on the Smithsonian Channel's Air Disasters as "Soccer Tragedy" in November 2019.

The Rooster Teeth podcast Black Box Down reviewed this incident in Episode 109.

See also 
 List of accidents involving sports teams
 Avianca Flight 52

Notes

References

Accident reports
The Spanish version is authoritative, also translated to English by Aviation Accident and Incident Investigation Group.

Further reading
  (thesis)

External links 

 
 
 Air service agreements in Brazil (Archive)

 
2016 Copa Sudamericana
2016 in Brazilian football
2016 in Colombia
Aviation accidents and incidents in 2016
Aviation accidents and incidents in Colombia
Associação Chapecoense de Futebol
Accidents and incidents involving the British Aerospace 146
Aviation accidents and incidents involving professional sports teams
History of Antioquia Department
November 2016 events in South America
Brazil–Colombia relations
Airliner accidents and incidents caused by fuel exhaustion